Navobod is a town in Tajikistan. It is located in Rudaki District, one of the Districts of Republican Subordination. The population of the town is 10,200 (January 2020 estimate). The town lies west of the capital Dushanbe.

References

Populated places in Districts of Republican Subordination
Jamoats of Tajikistan